Kaila Adia Story-Jackson (born January 9, 1980) is an American academic and podcaster. Story's academic work focuses on the intersections of gender, sexuality, and race.

Early life and education
Story was born in Ann Arbor, Michigan. She came out as a lesbian at the age of 16.

Story completed a bachelor's degree in Women and Gender Studies at DePaul University. At DePaul Story declared herself a feminist, though she felt she was "much more hard core" than her white feminist peers. She also noted that she was the only black female student majoring in women's studies during her first three years in college. Story graduated from Temple University in 2007 with a masters and doctorate in African American Studies, and a certificate in Women and Gender Studies.

Career
Story is an associate professor of Women's and Gender Studies at the University of Louisville, with a joint appointment in the Pan-African Studies department. She holds the Audre Lord Chair in Race, Gender, and Sexuality. She has created courses on intersectional topics, including "Black Lesbian Lives" and "Queer Perspectives in Literature and Film".    Story has been voted "faculty favorite" at Louisville every year since 2007.

Story co-hosts the Strange Fruit podcast on public radio station WFPL with Jaison Gardner. The podcast, which covers topics including race, the LGBTQ community, and social justice, celebrated its 200th episode in June 2017. Guests interviewed on the podcast have included Janelle Monáe, Janet Mock, and Wanda Sykes.

Honors and recognition
In October 2015, Story was honored as a "champion of fairness" at a Fairness Campaign event in Louisville, for making an impact on LGBT civil rights.

In June 2017, Story was included in the inaugural NBC Out #Pride30 list.

Personal life
Story married her wife Missy Story-Jackson in April 2016. The couple lives in Louisville, Kentucky.

Selected publications

References

External links 

 

Living people
1980 births
African-American academics
American women academics
DePaul University alumni
Lesbian academics
LGBT African Americans
People from Ann Arbor, Michigan
Temple University alumni
University of Louisville faculty
American podcasters
LGBT people from Michigan
American women podcasters
21st-century African-American people
21st-century African-American women
20th-century African-American people
20th-century African-American women